Platynaspis flavoguttata is a species of lady beetle native to India, Sri Lanka and Myanmar.

Distribution
In India, the species is observed from Sagara: Mullluman, Karnataka province. In Sri Lanka, it is found in Habaraduwa area, Galle district.

Description
It is a broad oval insect with densely pubescent body and a mixture of yellow and dark brown hairs. Head yellowish with a longitudinal median reddish brown band. Sometimes there can be a reddish brown band with a pair of yellowish lateral spots. Pronotum dark reddish brown with three yellowish markings. Each elytron consists with three spots in a 2-1 arrangement. Ventral side reddish color. Antennae, mouthparts, and legs are lighter yellowish brown.

Sri Lanka form is slightly different from Indian counterparts: head more or less fully brown. Pronotum reddish brown. There are subtriangular, yellowish lateral markings on pronotum. Elytron with the discal spot distinctly more rounded, and the apical spot is crescent-shaped.

Biology
Larva is observed in the holes in Terminalia paniculata. Show muturalistic relationship with red ants.

References 

Coccinellidae
Insects of Sri Lanka
Insects described in 1906